Pankratz was a racing car constructor.

World Championship Indy 500 results

Formula One constructors (Indianapolis only)
American racecar constructors